The Mountain Moving Coffeehouse for Womyn and Children was a lesbian feminist music venue, located in Chicago and known across the United States. It operated for thirty-one years, from 1974 until 2005. The name of the organization evokes the political task that feminists must "move the mountains" of institutional sexism and homophobia. The alternative spelling of "womyn" represented an expression of female independence and a repudiation of traditions that define women by reference to a male norm.

The "coffeehouse" was a once-a-week Saturday night gathering, held at a rented space in churches, in various north side Chicago neighborhoods, that presented woman-identified music and entertainment by and for lesbians and feminists. Drug and alcohol-free, the space was intended as an alternative to the lesbian bar scene. The organization was founded by lesbian-feminist activists as a safe-space for women and their young children. Male children over the age of two and transgender women were not allowed to attend.

The womyn-born womyn policy generated some controversy during the 1980s when pressure was put on the coffeehouse to allow admittance to men, as well as in the 1990s when the policy was contested by transgender women. It was claimed that the policy was discriminatory and created "mental difficulties" for transgender women. The policy was also challenged in the 1990s by a local gay male journalist. However, the organization defended its policy and never allowed admittance to men or to transgender women.

In 1993, the coffeehouse was inducted into the Chicago Gay and Lesbian Hall of Fame.

Upon the closure of the coffeehouse on December 10, 2005, it was the oldest continuously operating womyn-born womyn and girl-only concert venue in the United States. A successor organization was created called the Kindred Hearts' Coffeehouse, which serves as a monthly event offering women's music.

References

Further reading

External links
  Mountain Moving Coffeehouse for Womyn website
  Mountain Moving Coffeehouse for Womyn and Children at Chicago Gay and Lesbian Hall of Fame (archive)

1974 establishments in Illinois
2005 disestablishments in Illinois
Feminist collectives
Lesbian collectives
Lesbian culture in Illinois
Lesbian history
Lesbian separatism
Radical feminist organizations
Women in Illinois
Women-only spaces
Women's music
Coffeehouses and cafés in the United States
Feminist organizations in the United States
Lesbian organizations in the United States
Women's organizations based in the United States
LGBT culture in Chicago
Organizations based in Chicago
Defunct organizations based in Illinois
Inductees of the Chicago LGBT Hall of Fame